The Berggruen Prize for Philosophy and Culture is a US$1-million award given each year to a significant individual in the field of philosophy. It is awarded by the Berggruen Institute to "thinkers whose ideas have helped us find direction, wisdom, and improved self-understanding in a world being rapidly transformed by profound social, technological, political, cultural, and economic change."

The Berggruen Prize was first awarded in 2016 with the overt purpose of becoming a "Nobel prize for philosophy". The first recipient of the Berggruen Prize was the Canadian philosopher Charles Taylor, whose work "urges us to see humans as constituted not only by their biology or their personal intentions, but also by their existence within language and webs of meaningful relationships."

The prize is awarded annually in December, with a ceremony at the New York Public Library. In 2016, ceremony speakers included University of Pennsylvania president Amy Gutmann and journalist Fareed Zakaria.

Winners

Prize jury

Current Prize Jury Members

Emeriti Prize Jury Members

See also
 Kyoto Prize in Arts and Philosophy

References

External links
 
 Berggruen Prize Winner Charles Taylor on the Big Questions; series of videos produced by the Berggruen Institute on occasion of Charles Taylor winning the inaugural prize. 
 The Berggruen Prize; commentary of Berggruen Prize jurors such as Amy Gutmann, Antonio Damasio, and Wang Hui on the significance of the Prize.

Academic awards
Awards established in 2016
Humanities awards
International awards
Philosophy awards
Philosophy events